Ornella Oettl Reyes (born 14 December 1991) is a German-Peruvian alpine skier who was part of the first Peruvian delegation to the Winter Olympics. She specializes in slalom and giant slalom and has competed in six World Championships and two Winter Olympics.

Career 
Born in Munich, Germany to a German father and a Peruvian mother, Oettl Reyes carries both citizenships. 

Her first International Ski Federation (FIS) competition was the 2006 German National Junior Race, where she was disqualified in the first slalom run and did not finish the second giant slalom run. As of February 2022, her best finish in any competition was second place at a 2008 giant slalom event in Germany. 

Since June 2009, Oettl Reyes has been representing Peru in the FIS, having previously been registered as German. At the age of 18, she made her Olympic debut at the 2010 Olympics in Canada, as part of the first-ever Peruvian delegation to the Winter Olympics. A year later, she participated in her first World Championship.

Oettl Reyes has participated in every World Championship since 2011, with varying success. In the 2021 World Championship, she placed 36th in slalom, her best-ever placement in the competition as of 2022.

Results

Personal life 
Oettl Reyes has two siblings. Her younger brother Manfred is also an alpine skier.

References

1991 births
Living people
Citizens of Peru through descent
Peruvian female alpine skiers
Olympic alpine skiers of Peru
Alpine skiers at the 2010 Winter Olympics
Alpine skiers at the 2014 Winter Olympics
Alpine skiers at the 2022 Winter Olympics
Peruvian people of German descent
Skiers from Munich
German female alpine skiers
German people of Peruvian descent
Sportspeople of Peruvian descent